Barbate Club de Fútbol is a Spanish football team based in Barbate. Founded in 1945, the team plays in Regional Preferente de Cádiz. The club's home ground is Municipal de Barbate.

Season to season

8 seasons in Tercera División

Notable former players
 Pejiño
 Chico Cebolla
 Bryan Gil
 Francis Pérez
 Juan "Melli"

External links
lapreferente.com profile

Association football clubs established in 1945
Football clubs in Andalusia
Divisiones Regionales de Fútbol clubs
1945 establishments in Spain